Monarch Industry (also dubbed The Rebel Princess) is a 2021 Chinese fictional costume drama. This drama is adapted from MeiYuZhe’s novel Di Wang Ye, and stars Zhang Ziyi, Zhou Yiwei, Tony Yang, Kara Wai, and Angie Chiu.

The drama was filmed between February and November 2018. It began broadcasting on Changsha News Channel on 8 January 2021, and on Youku on January 9, 2021.

Synopsis

The story is set against the fictional Cheng Dynasty involving the imperial Ma family and the noble clans; Wang clan of Langya and Xie clan of Chen. The royal family is supported by both the Wang and Xie clans for generations which results in recurring clashes for power whilst disregarding the wellbeing of the common people. Wang Xuan (played by Zhang Ziyi), and her first love, the third prince, Ma Zitan (played by Tony Yang), are childhood sweethearts that are madly in love. They wish to get married but are faced with multiple setbacks because of a prophecy that states, "to acquire a lady from the Wang clan is to obtain the world.".
 
Wang Xuan is ultimately coerced into marrying an accomplished general from the peasant class, Xiao Qi (played by Zhou Yiwei) who was bestowed the title Prince of Yuzhang. Xiao Qi is well aware that he commands 200,000 Ningshuo soldiers and is at risk of becoming a pawn in the struggle for power. He takes an extreme measure to avoid this by abruptly rushing out of the capital in the middle of the wedding banquet, leaving Wang Xuan ashamed, disheartened and insulted. The two were separated due to the awkward start of their marriage amidst rising political turmoil.  Wang Xuan is eventually moved by Xiao Qi's ambition to bring peace and prosperity to the common people. She finally decides to accept Xiao Qi who provides her with the freedom she is used to as she discovers her own calling and learns to cope with her prestigious yet complicated family, maturing into a lady in her own right. They gradually fall in love while overcoming various conflicting identities/roles/responsibilities, ethical dilemmas and political schemes to create a new era of stability.

Cast

Main
 Zhang Ziyi as Wang Xuan (A’Wu), Princess Shangyang → the Princess Consort of Yuzhang
 The daughter of Wang Lin and Princess Jinmin
 Zhou Yiwei as Xiao Qi, the General of the Ningshuo Army → the Prince of Yuzhang → the Prince Regent
 Tony Yang as Ma Zitan, the third prince → the Prince of Anping
 The third son of the Emperor by Noble Consort Xie

Supporting

The Imperial Family
 Heidi Wang as the late Empress Dowager Xiaomu
 Jiang Kai as Ma Yao, the Emperor
 Shi Ke as Wang Huanxi, the Empress → the Empress Dowager
 Wang Lin's younger sister; the mother of the Crown Prince
 Kara Wai as Noble Consort Xie
 Xie Yuan's younger sister; the mother of Zitan
 Guo Jiaming as Ma Zilong, the Crown Prince → the Emperor
 The eldest son of the Emperor by Empress Wang
 Zuo Xiaoqing as Xie Wanru, Princess Yifang → the Crown Princess → the Empress
 The daughter of Xie Yuan
 Purba Rgyal as Ma Zilü, the second prince
 The second son of the Emperor by a lowly consort

The Wang clan of Langya
 Yu Hewei as Wang Lin, the Duke of Jing; the Prime Minister
 Zhang Xingzhe as Wang Xu
 Wang Lin's younger brother
 Angie Chiu as Ma Jinruo, Princess Jinmin
 The Emperor's younger sister; Wang Lin's wife; the mother of Wang Su and Princess Shangyang
 Jia Yiping as Wang Su, the heir to the Duke of Jing → the Prince of Jiangxia
 The son of Wang Lin and Princess Jinmin
 Chen Jinru as Princess Huan Mi, the heiress consort of Jing
 The daughter of Huan Changde; Wang Su's wife
 Ceng Yixuan as Wang Qian
 Wang Xuan's cousin
 Liu Yun as Su Jin'er, Princess Shangyang's maid → Noble Consort
 Sui Yuan as Xiao Yuxiu, Princess Shangyang's maid → the Countess of Suyi
 Cao Jun as Pang Gui, leader of the covert guards of the Wang clan who is loyal to Wang Xuan

The Imperial Court
 Jiang Tao as Marquess Xie Yuan
 Zheng Wang as Wen Zongshen
 Li Jianxin as Huan Changde, the Duke of Jingyuan
 Liu Duanduan as Song Huai'en, a lieutenant in the Ningshuo Army → the Count of Suyi
 Hou Xiao as Hu Guanglie, a lieutenant in the Ningshuo Army
 Hai Ling as Hu Yao, a lieutenant in the Ningshuo Army
 Hu Guanglie's younger sister
 Peng Bo as Tang Jing, a lieutenant in the Ningshuo Army
 Li Yuxuan as Mu Lian

Hulan tribe
 Yuan Hong as Helan Zhen
 The illegitimate son of the King of Hulan
 Wang Ruolin as Helan Tuo
 The nephew of the King of Hulan

Critical reception 
The drama was highly anticipated as it was Zhang Ziyi's first foray into television dramas. Chinese netizens criticized that Zhang, who was 38 years old during the production, was portraying a 16-year-old person at the beginning of the show.

International broadcast 
The series has aired in South Africa channel E.Extra in English dubbed. American television stations, in cities including San Francisco and Seattle.

References

External links 

 

2021 Chinese television series debuts
Chinese historical television series
Chinese romance television series
Mandarin-language television shows